National Route 46 is a major highway on the Korea  It connects Incheon with the city(country) of Goseong, Gangwon Province

Main stopovers 

 Incheon
 Jung District - Michuhol District - Namdong District - Bupyeong District

 Gyeonggi Province
 Bucheon

 Seoul
 Guro District - Yeongdeungpo District - Mapo Bridge - Mapo District - Yongsan District - Seongdong District - Gwangjin District

 Gyeonggi Province
 Guri - Namyangju - Gapyeong County

 Gangwon Province
 Chuncheon - Hwacheon County - Chuncheon - Yanggu County - Inje County - Goseong County

Major intersections

 (■): Motorway
IS: Intersection, IC: Interchange

Incheon

Gyeonggi Province Bucheon City

Seoul 

  Motorway section
 Mapo Br. IC - Cheonho Br. IC (Gangbyeonbuk-ro)

Gyeonggi Province

Gangwon Province 

  Motorway section
 Mancheon IC - Sinbuk IS

References

46
Roads in Incheon
Roads in Gyeonggi
Roads in Seoul
Roads in Gangwon